Ansaldi is an Italian surname. Notable people with the surname include:

 Casto Innocenzio Ansaldi (1710–1780), Italian professor, theologian and archaeologist
 Cristian Ansaldi (born 1986), Argentine professional footballer 
 Giovanni Andrea Ansaldi (1584–1630), Italian painter active mainly in Genoa
 Innocenzio Ansaldi (1734–1816), Italian painter and writer on art
 Marilena Ansaldi (1934–2021), Brazilian ballet dancer, choreographer and actress 
 Michele Ansaldi,  Italian automobile engineer, designer, and industrialist

See also 
 Ansaldo (disambiguation)

Italian-language surnames